Vasil Amashukeli (March 14, 1886 in Kutaisi – December 1, 1977 in Tbilisi) was an early Georgian film director and cinematographer who worked in the Cinema of Azerbaijan and Georgia.

He studied at Vasil Tamarashvili Art School in Kutaisi. In 1908 he graduated from Moscow division courses of French film firm “Gomon”. Amashukeli is the first Georgian documentary director.

In 1907 Amashukeli working in Baku made several films of oil production in the capital including the extracting process. His films included Bakı Bazarlarının Tipləri (Types of Bakuvian Bazaars - short documentary), Daş Kömür Daşınması (Transportation of Coal), Dəniz kənarında gəzinti (Seaside Walk), Neft buruqlarında iş (Work at Oil Derricks), and Neftin çıxarılması (Oil Extraction) all filmed in 1907.

Then he made several films between 1908 and 1912. These included: Nakhet tqveni sakhe, Gaseirneba zgvis sanapiroze (Walking on the Beach) (1908), Qutaisis peizajebi (Sides of City Qutaisi), Qutaisis parki (Park of Qutaisi) (1911) and Akakis mogzauroba  (Journey of Akaki) in 1912, that is the unique monument of Georgian documentary art. This film let to the outbreak of the Georgia documentary cinematography.

The memories of Vasil Amashukeli about the journey of Akaki Tsereteli in Racha-Lechkhumi, together with the photos taken during the journey, are preserved at the department of Literature and Art of the Central Archive of the Contemporary History of the National Archives of Georgia.

Filmography
 As director
 Journey of Akaki (1912)
 Qutaisis parki (Short documentary) (1911)
 Qutaisis peizajebi (Short documentary) (1911)
 Gaseirneba zgvis sanapiroze (Short) (1908)
 Nakhet tqveni sakhe (Documentary) (1908)
 As cinematographer
 Journey of Akaki (1912)
 Qutaisis parki (Short documentary) (1911)
 Qutaisis peizajebi (Short documentary) (1911)
 Gaseirneba zgvis sanapiroze (Short) (1908)
 Nakhet tqveni sakhe (Documentary) (1908)

References

External links

1886 births
1977 deaths
Film directors from Georgia (country)
Azerbaijani film directors
Cinematographers from Georgia (country)
Azerbaijani cinematographers
People from Kutaisi